"Cry" is a song by British duo Waterfront, first released as a single in 1988. The song was a hit in both the UK and US. It reached the top 20 on the UK Singles Chart, peaking at No. 17 in May 1989, and the top 10 on the Billboard Hot 100, at No. 10 in June 1989. The song appears on their 1989 self-titled debut album.

Chart history

Weekly charts

Year-end charts

References

1988 songs
1988 singles
1989 singles
Polydor Records singles
British pop songs